The Thailand women's national rugby union team played their first test match against Kazakhstan in 2005.

Results summary
(Full internationals only)

Results

Full internationals

See also
 Rugby union in Thailand

References

External links
 Thailand on World Rugby
 Thailand on rugbydata.com
  on ThaiRugbyUnion.com

Women's national rugby union teams
Asian national women's rugby union teams
Rugby union in Thailand
Thailand national rugby union team
2005 establishments in Thailand

de:Thailändische Rugby-Union-Nationalmannschaft
fr:Équipe de Thaïlande de rugby à XV